Pekka Tarjanne (1937–2010) was a scientist and politician who served as the chairman of the Liberal Party and minister of transport in Finland. He also headed the International Telecommunication Union from 1989 and 1999.

Early life and education
Tarjanne was born in Stockholm, Sweden, on 19 September 1937. In 1960 he obtained his master of science degree in engineering and a PhD degree in technology from Helsinki University of Technology at age 24.

Career
Tarjanne carried out research and teaching in Denmark and the United States and returned to Finland in 1965. He was promoted to the professorship in theoretical physics at the University of Oulu. From 1967 he worked as a professor in the same field at the University of Helsinki. He served as the chairman of the Liberal Party from 1968 to 1978. On 23 March 1970 he was elected to the Finnish Parliament where he served until 20 September 1977. He was the minister of transport and communications and the state minister responsible for Nordic cooperation between 4 September 1972 and 12 June 1975 in the cabinet led by Prime Minister Kalevi Sorsa. In 1977 Tarjanne was appointed director-general of posts and telecommunications which he held until 1989. In 1989 he was elected secretary-general of the International Telecommunication Union in the conference held in Nice, France. He was re-elected to the same post in the conference in Kyoto, Japan, in 1994 and held the post until 1999. 

He was the deputy CEO of a Bermuda-based company, Project Oxygen Ltd between 1999 and 2000. Tarjanne also served as the special advisor to the Secretary-General of the United Nations on information and communication technologies at the beginning of the 2000s. As of 2003 and 2004 he was professor at the Academy of Technology and the chair of the eight-member International Award Selection Committee.

Personal life and death
Tarjanne was married. He died in Hattula on 24 February 2010.

Recognition
Tarjanne and his wife, Aino, were named by Geneva State Council as the honorary citizens for their "major contribution to enhancing Geneva's reputation as an international centre".

References

External links

20th-century Finnish engineers
21st-century Finnish businesspeople
1937 births
2010 deaths
Academic staff of the University of Oulu
Aalto University alumni
Finnish physicists
Leaders of political parties in Finland
Liberals (Finland) politicians
Members of the Parliament of Finland (1970–72)
Members of the Parliament of Finland (1972–75)
Members of the Parliament of Finland (1975–79)
Ministers of Transport and Public Works of Finland
Politicians from Stockholm